Valuthoor or Valathur is a small panchayat village located at papanasam taluk in Thanjavur district in the Indian state of Tamil Nadu. It is 18 km from Tanjore and 22 km from Kumbakonam. The river Kudamurutti passes through this village. In the 2011 census it had a population of 5161 in 1222 households.

Geography
Valuthoor [Valoothoor] is a panchayat town of Thanjavur district, Tamil Nadu, located at.

Education

Schools
Shaukathul Islam (B.M.S) Higher Secondary School(Govt aided), Main Road, Valuthoor.
Alif Matriculation School(Pvt), umar street, Valuthoor.

College

Polytechnic College
Government Polytechnic College - Regunathapuram -Valuthur - 614210 - Papanasam Taluk.

Railway station
The nearest railway station is Ayyampettai (Thanjavur district) which is 2 km away from valuthoor.

Police station
Valuthoor is under the control of Ayyampettai (Thanjavur district) Police station.

Politics

Lok Sabha constituency
Valuthoor assembly constituency is part of Mayiladuturai.

Tamil Nadu state constituency
Valuthoor assembly constituency is part of Papanasam.

References

Villages in Thanjavur district